Yeshivat Torat HaChaim is an educational yeshiva network founded by Rabbi Shmuel Tal in 1996, originally situated in the Gush Katif (Gaza Strip) settlement of Neve Dekalim. After the 2005 disengagement from Gaza, Torat HaChaim was re-established in the religious settlement, Yad Binyamin, between Jerusalem and Ashdod. 

Rav Tal believes in inclusiveness in the student body, with students representing most types of orthodoxy, Haredi and Religious Zionist, and stresses the need to become more involved in every aspect of Israeli society. He encourages his students to serve in the Nahal Haredi or to do standard National Service. 

The Torat HaChaim network numbers (in 2016–2017) 1,600 students and includes: 
a Talmud Torah
elementary girls school
yeshiva ketana
ulpana for girls
yeshiva gedola
kollel
yeshiva for baalei teshuva
midrasha for baalot teshuva
midrasha for women after Sherut Leumi (a variant on national Service)
yeshiva for haredi men
film and theater school (separate days for men and women)
school for counseling and therapeutic training (separate days for men and women)
Tal Chaim publication institute
off campus outreach programs
off campus teacher training program
community of families in Nazareth Ilit

Future plans include a music academy for men and women, and high schools for sons and daughters of baalei teshuva.

External links
 Yeshivat Torat HaChaim Official website

Religious Zionist yeshivot